Association football at the professional level is a low scoring sport (see article Association football for more detail). An athlete in football can score 100 goals in international matches by playing a forward position, maintaining a high-level of success in scoring for a long period of usually more than 10 years. This page lists the highly accomplished top all-time female goal scorers in official international football matches for their country.

For every football player, especially a player not playing in a forward position, a measure of their accomplishment is the number of times they played for the national team, which shows the value to the team as a competitor on the field. See Most capped international women footballers. The world governing body FIFA calls that elite group the Century Club.

List of players with 100 or more international goals
The first player to reach 100 international goals was Italian Elisabetta Vignotto. Abby Wambach scored 100 goals in 9 years, while Christine Sinclair reached the milestone in just under 10 years while Mia Hamm is the youngest player to score 100 international goals at the age of 26 years 185 days. Most played exclusively in the forward position, with Kristine Lilly and Michelle Akers having also played as midfielder. All players scored at a high average rate of more than one goal every three matches. International goals in this list should not include goals scored in penalty-shoot-out; see Penalty shootout (association football). Players who are currently active at international level are indicated in bold type background.

Notes
1 Only Marta's goals scored in full international matches (senior int'l team v senior int'l team) count toward international goal totals.

2 Vignotto reportedly scored 107, or 108 goals and her record was broken by Mia Hamm.
FIFA indicates that she made 110 appearances. The Italian Football Federation (FIGC) website lists her record as 97 goals in 95 matches.

3 Akers' goal total was long thought to be 105. U.S. Soccer has revised it to 107 after discovering two friendlies in 1995. This means her 100th international goal was scored on September 20, 1998, vs. Brazil, and not in January 1999 vs. Portugal.

4 Panico reportedly scored 108 goals in 200 games.

5 FIFA previously listed 166 games, but only 163 games were recorded.

6 Morace reportedly scored 105 goals in 153 games.
The FIGC website lists Morace's record as 94 goals in 136 games.

7 Han Duan reportedly scored her one hundredth goal on 6 August 2008 in China's opening match against Sweden at Beijing 2008 Olympics. Another source reported that she scored her goal 101 that day. FIFA Match Report shows that she scored only one goal in that match.

Number of players with 100 or more goals by country

Number of players with 100 or more goals by confederation

No OFC player has scored 100 goals in full internationals. The current record holder is New Zealand player Amber Hearn, with 54 goals in 125 matches between 2004 and 2018.

See also
 List of top international women's football goal scorers by country
 List of women's footballers with 100 or more international caps
 List of top international men's football goal scorers by country
 List of men's footballers with 100 or more international caps

References

Association football player non-biographical articles
Women goals
Goals
Women's over 100 goals